Chuck Kim (born January 20, 1984) is an American retired soccer player.

Career
At the age of 18, during his senior year at Beverly Hills High School, Kim left to play for Pittsburgh Riverhounds SC in the American second division.

After that, he played for Alemannia Aachen in the German Bundesliga II and Lierse S.K. in the Belgian top flight.

Later, Kim joined the American second division again, playing for California Victory.

References

External links
 Chuck Kim at SoccerStats.us

American soccer players
Living people
Association football midfielders
Association football wingers
1984 births